The Ven. Edward Spencer Noakes, MA, LL.D (1861-1944) was Archdeacon of Derby from 1909 to  1943.

He was born at Brede in  1861, educated at St Catharine's College, Cambridge  and  ordained deacon in 1889 and priest in 1891. His first post was at St Andrew the Less, Cambridge. He was a teacher at  The Perse School, Cambridge then Head teacher at Magnus Grammar School. He was Vicar of Edale from 1905 to 1908 (and Rural Dean of Eyam from 1907 to 1908); Vicar of St John's, Derby from 1908 to 1914; and  Vicar of St Matthew, Darley Abbey from 1914 to 1930.

He died on 30 December 1944.

Notes

1863 births
People from Hastings
Alumni of St Catharine's College, Cambridge
Archdeacons of Derby
1944 deaths
People from Derby
People from Darley Abbey